Hellinsia mongolicus is a moth of the family Pterophoridae. It is found in the Russian Far East and Mongolia.

References 

Moths described in 1972
mongolicus
Plume moths of Asia